Momhil Sar, or Mumhail Sar as pronounced in Wakhi is at  above sea level, is the 64th highest mountain peak in the world. Mumhail Sar in Wakhi means the mountain that overlooks or is above Grandmother's cattle pen or paddock. It is situated in Shimshal Valley the Hispar Muztagh subrange of the Karakoram range, a few kilometres to the north-west of its parent peak Trivor.

The first people to reach the top were Hans Schell and his expedition, in 1965.

References 

Seven-thousanders of the Karakoram
Mountains of Gilgit-Baltistan